Breakfast on Pluto is a 2005 comedy-drama film written and directed by Neil Jordan and based on the 1998 novel of the same name by Patrick McCabe, as adapted by Jordan and McCabe. The film stars Cillian Murphy as a transgender foundling searching for love and her long-lost mother in small town Ireland and London in the 1970s.

Plot

The film is divided into 36 chapters. In the fictional Irish town of Tyrellin, bordering Northern Ireland in the late 1970s, cartoon robins narrate as Patrick Braden's mother, Eily Bergin, leaves her baby on the doorstep of the local parochial house, where his father, Father Liam, lives. 

Patrick is placed with an unloving foster mother. Male at birth, young Patrick is later shown donning a dress and lipstick, which angers her foster family. Patrick is accepted by her close friends, Charlie, Irwin, and Lawrence, as well as by Lawrence's father, who tells Patrick that Eily looked like blonde American movie star Mitzi Gaynor.

In Patrick's late teens, Patrick gets into trouble in school by writing explicit fiction imagining how she was conceived by her parents and inquiring about where to get a sex change. Patrick comes out as transgender, renames herself Kitten, also going by Patricia, and approaches Father Liam in confession, asking about Eily, but is rebuffed. 

Kitten runs away from home, catching a ride with a glam rock band, Billy Hatchet and the Mohawks, and flirting with leader Billy. He installs the lovestruck, homeless Kitten in a trailer, where she discovers he's hiding guns for the IRA. 

Meanwhile, Irwin has begun to work with the IRA, much to his now-girlfriend Charlie's dismay. Kitten dismisses Irwin's politics as "serious, serious, serious," but after Lawrence is killed by police detonating a suspected IRA car bomb, she tosses their gun cache into a lake. 

Billy abandons Kitten to flee the IRA, forcing her to face the "serious, serious, serious," men alone. Her lack of connection to their politics saves her from being murdered.

Kitten next journeys to London searching for Eily, but initial inquiries prove fruitless. Penniless, she shelters in a tiny cottage in a park, only to find that it's a children's entertainment park for The Wombles. 

Kitten gets a job as a singing, dancing Womble, but immediately loses it when her sponsor and co-worker punches their boss. Forced into prostitution, she is violently attacked by her first client, saving herself from strangulation by spraying him in the eyes with Chanel No. 5.

At a diner, magician Bertie Vaughan asks her what she is writing in her notebook. She explains it's the story of "The Phantom Lady" who was "swallowed up" by the big city, then reveals it's about the mother she is seeking. Bertie hires her to be his magician's assistant, turning her life story into a hypnosis act. 

On a romantic day trip, Bertie tries to kiss her and she explains that she’s transgender, something he already knew. Soon, Charlie finds Bertie's show and takes Kitten away.

Kitten goes to a club frequented by British soldiers and dances with one, only to be injured when the club is bombed by the IRA. Police discover that Kitten is transgender and Irish, so she is arrested as a suspected terrorist. 

Beaten and deprived of sleep, she writes a hyperbolic statement, shown in a fantasy spy film spoof sequence. The police's attitude softens, realising she is innocent, and they release her. With no place to go, Kitten begs to stay in the station, but is tossed into the street.

Kitten is again forced to turn tricks, but is saved by one of the cops who interrogated her. He brings her to a peep show where she transforms herself into a blonde. Her repentant father finds her and in a scene mirroring their confessional one, professes his love and tells Kitten where to find Eily. 

She goes to her house posing as a telephone company market researcher and discovers a younger half-brother whose name is also Patrick. She faints upon meeting Eily, but after reviving does not reveal her identity.

When Irwin is killed by the IRA, Kitten goes home to tend to a pregnant Charlie and reconcile with her priest father. The town reacts against the unwed mother and her transgender friend living with him by firebombing the parish house. Kitten and Charlie flee to London. 

In the final scene, they run into pregnant Eily and little Patrick at the doctor's office, where Charlie is getting post-natal care. Kitten is friendly, but still doesn't reveal who she is.

Cast

Production
To prepare for the lead role of Kitten, Murphy studied women's body language and for a few weeks met with a drag queen who instructed him and took him out clubbing with friends.

Neil Jordan and Pat McCabe made big changes to the story in their adaptation of the novel for the silver screen. In the book, the protagonist is called "Pussy", but Jordan and McCabe rename her "Kitten" in the film. Unlike the highly sexual Pussy, who is sexually involved with numerous male and female characters in some rather kinky situations as well as a few long-term relationships, Kitten doesn't even kiss another character on the lips. One sexual encounter for hire is strongly implied, but Kitten is not shown being overtly sexual with anyone on screen. Kitten's flirtatious relationships with the series of male characters she meets throughout the film are never shown or strongly implied to have been consummated, leaving the yearning main character unrequited.

The seaside scene between Kitten and Bertie was considered by some to be an allusion to director Jordan's earlier film The Crying Game, which also involved a transgender major character, the IRA, and actor Stephen Rea. In The Crying Game, Rea's character doesn't realise that the woman he has fallen for and becomes sexually involved with is transgender. In Breakfast on Pluto, Kitten confesses that she's "not a girl" before Rea's character can kiss her, and he says kindly that he already knew, but does not follow through with the kiss.

The author of the novel upon which the film is based, co-screenwriter Patrick McCabe, has a cameo in the film as Kitten's creative writing teacher.

Reception
Rotten Tomatoes gives the film a score of 57% based on 116 reviews, with an average score of 6.10/10.

Awards and nominations
For his portrayal of Kitten, Murphy won the 2007 IFTA Award for Best Actor and was nominated for a Golden Globe for Best Performance by an Actor in a Motion Picture – Musical or Comedy.

Jordan also won the 2007 IFTA for Best Director and Jordan and McCabe took home the Best Script IFTA.

See also
 Hedwig and the Angry Inch (2001)
 The Crying Game (1992)

References

Further reading

External links
 
 Breakfast on Pluto at BFI
 Breakfast on Pluto at British Council–Film
 Breakfast on Pluto at Lumiere
 
 
 

2005 films
2005 comedy-drama films
2005 LGBT-related films
British comedy-drama films
British LGBT-related films
British nonlinear narrative films
Down syndrome in film
2000s English-language films
English-language Irish films
Irish comedy-drama films
Irish LGBT-related films
Films about the Irish Republican Army
Films about The Troubles (Northern Ireland)
Films based on Irish novels
Films directed by Neil Jordan
Films set in the 1970s
Films shot in County Wicklow
Films shot in Essex
Films shot in Northern Ireland
LGBT-related comedy-drama films
Number 9 Films films
Pathé films
Irish Film Board films
Films about trans women
2000s British films